Frazier Wells, sometimes known as Frazier Well or Fraziers Well, is a populated place situated in Coconino County, Arizona, United States, located approximately 30 miles northeast of Peach Springs.

Frazier Wells has been the site of the Hualapai Rodeo. It was also the site of a sawmill, which was unsuccessful and closed by 1951.

Circa 1951, the Frazier Wells school was operationally handed over to the state per a U.S. Bureau of Indian Affairs grant.

References

Populated places in Coconino County, Arizona